Mokronazarov is a rural locality (a khutor) in Dukmasovskoye Rural Settlement of Shovgenovsky District, the Republic of Adygea, Russia. The population was 378 as of 2018. There are 5 streets.

Geography 
Mokronazarov is located on the right bank of the river of Hyaga, near the Orekhov and Tikhonov khutors, 28 km west of Khakurinokhabl (the district's administrative centre) by road. Orekhov is the nearest rural locality.

References 

Rural localities in Shovgenovsky District